William R. Johnson is an American businessman and is the former president, CEO and chairman of H. J. Heinz.

He worked at Drackett as an assistant product manager for Behold furniture polish, starting at $13,000 a year. He worked at Ralston Purina, Frito-Lay and Anderson-Clayton Foods before joining Heinz in 1982 as general manager of new business.

In 1988, as president and CEO of the poorly performing Heinz Pet Products, he turned around a poorly performing operation which some analysts had proclaimed unsalvageable. In 1992, he did the same thing at the highly visible Starkist Foods. In 1993 he was named senior vice president and director, in 1996 president and COO, and in 1998, named president and CEO. In 2000, he became chairman as well.

Johnson is fiscally conservative, focusing on cost-containment, and the performance of major brands, as he faces stiff competition and pricing demands from wholesalers. He is described by coworkers as incredibly intense; he agrees with that assessment.

He credits his father, Bill "Tiger" Johnson with instilling him with a fiercely competitive spirit and a passionate desire to win. Tiger Johnson was a center for the San Francisco 49ers and then head coach of the Cincinnati Bengals. Johnson also learned motivation from his father and other coaches. In the Pittsburgh Post-Gazette, he told reporter Patricia Sabatini that, "Some people need to be handled gently. Other people you can kick in the rear end" (May 18, 1998).

Johnson was born and grew up in Palo Alto. He married Susie in 1974. They have two children, Brad and Tracy, who are also pursuing careers in business.

On February 11, 2009, the board of directors of UPS (NYSE:UPS) elected William R. Johnson as a new independent director of the company.

Education
Johnson earned his Bachelor of Arts degree from the University of California, Los Angeles in 1971. While a student at UCLA, he was initiated into the Alpha Tau Omega fraternity. Later, he moved to Austin, Texas to attend the McCombs School of Business at the University of Texas, from which he received a master's degree in Business Administration in 1974.

References
 William R. Johnson: Chairman, President and Chief Executive Officer, H. J. Heinz Company
 H. J. Heinz Company Board

1949 births
American chief executives of food industry companies
Living people
University of California, Los Angeles alumni
McCombs School of Business alumni
Heinz people
American chief operating officers